The Pro-Composites Freedom is an American amateur-built aircraft, under development by Pro-Composites of Buffalo Grove, Illinois. The aircraft is intended to be supplied in the form of plans for amateur construction, with some pre-formed parts made available to speed construction.

Design and development
The aircraft features a cantilever low-wing, a four-seat enclosed cabin accessed by doors, fixed tricycle landing gear with wheel pants and a single engine in tractor configuration.

The aircraft is made from pre-formed flat fiberglass and foam composite panels which are then radius bent to shape. Its  span wing employs a NACA 63A-214 airfoil at the wing root, transitioning to a NACA 63A-212 airfoil at the wing tip. The landing gear features a fully castering nosewheel and differential braking for steering.

The manufacturer markets the design as "the only composite, plans built, 4 seat  aircraft that uses a conventional - non canard - platform. It can be constructed entirely from the manuals using raw materials or from pre-formed parts."

Specifications (Freedom)

References

External links

Homebuilt aircraft
Single-engined tractor aircraft
Freedom
Low-wing aircraft
Proposed aircraft of the United States